Betterton may refer to:

 Betterton, Maryland, a town in the United States
 Betterton, a hamlet within the parish of Lockinge in Oxfordshire, England
 Henry Betterton, 1st Baron Rushcliffe (1872 – 1949)
 Thomas Betterton (ca. 1635 – 1710), English actor